Tabala, is the name of a Roman and Byzantine town and a Bishopric in ancient Lydia. Tabala was on the Hermus River, and minted its own coins. It is no doubt the same as the one mentioned by Hierocles under the name of Gabala, which is perhaps only miswritten for Tabala. It is even possible that it may be the town of Tabae or Tabai (Τάβαι), which Stephanus of Byzantium assigns to Lydia.

Its site is located near Burgaz in Asiatic Turkey.

Bishopric
A See at Tabala was founded in the Roman era, and remains today a titular see of the Roman Catholic Church.
Known Bishops
 Polycarp (Council of Chalcedon) 
Johannes Peter Franziskus Ross (18 May 1928 Appointed - 26 Dec 1969)

References

Populated places in ancient Lydia
Former populated places in Turkey
Roman towns and cities in Turkey
History of Manisa Province
Catholic titular sees in Asia
Dioceses established in the 1st century
Greek colonies in Anatolia
Ancient Greek archaeological sites in Turkey
Populated places of the Byzantine Empire